Bernhard Sälzer (4 September 1940 – 18 December 1993) was a German politician (CDU), member of the Landtag of Hesse and of the European Parliament.

Sources 
 Jochen Lengemann, President of the Landtag of Hesse (ed.): Das Hessen-Parlament 1946–1986. Biographisches Handbuch des Beratenden Landesausschusses, der Verfassungsberatenden Landesversammlung und des Hessischen Landtags (1.–11. Wahlperiode). Insel-Verlag, Frankfurt am Main 1986

External links 
 European Parliament: database of MEPs - Bernhard Sälzer

Politicians from Berlin
1940 births
1993 deaths
Christian Democratic Union of Germany politicians
Members of the Landtag of Hesse
Christian Democratic Union of Germany MEPs
Road incident deaths in Germany
MEPs for Germany 1979–1984
MEPs for Germany 1984–1989